Y4 may refer to:

 Pancreatic polypeptide receptor 1, a protein that in humans is encoded by the PPYR1 gene
 a Mazda diesel engine
 IATA airline designator for Volaris
 LNER Class Y4, a class of British steam